Waseem Ahmad (Punjabi, Urdu: وسیم احمد) (born 10 April 1977, in Vehari, Punjab, Pakistan) is a Pakistani field hockey player and ex-captain of Pakistan Hockey Team. He belongs to a Jat family.(_Randawah).

He is regarded as one of the best left-halves in the world, and became the most capped midfielder and most capped player for Pakistan. After announcing his retirement from International hockey during a press conference held after Pakistan-India third-place match of 26th Champions Trophy in Lahore, former Pakistan captain Waseem Ahmad later staged a comeback to international hockey in 2006 for World Cup and retired immediately after Pakistan team campaign in London Olympics 2012.

Career 
He is regarded as one of the best left-halves in the world, and became the most capped midfielder and most capped player for Pakistan.
After announcing his retirement from International hockey during a press conference held after Pakistan-India third-place match of 26th Champions Trophy in Lahore, former Pakistan captain Waseem Ahmad later staged a comeback to international hockey in 2006 for World Cup and retired immediately after Pakistan team campaign in London Olympics 2012.

Tamgha-e-Imtiaz:

He played most number of matches for Pakistan and was awarded Tamgha-e-Imtiaz (Award of excellence).

See also
 Pakistan Hockey Federation

References

External links
 

Living people
1977 births
Pakistani male field hockey players
Male field hockey midfielders
Field hockey players at the 2000 Summer Olympics
Field hockey players at the 2004 Summer Olympics
Field hockey players at the 2012 Summer Olympics
1998 Men's Hockey World Cup players
2002 Men's Hockey World Cup players
2006 Men's Hockey World Cup players
2010 Men's Hockey World Cup players
Field hockey players at the 2010 Commonwealth Games
Asian Games gold medalists for Pakistan
Olympic field hockey players of Pakistan
Asian Games medalists in field hockey
Field hockey players at the 1998 Asian Games
Field hockey players at the 2002 Asian Games
Field hockey players at the 2010 Asian Games
World Series Hockey players
People from Vehari District
Asian Games bronze medalists for Pakistan
Commonwealth Games bronze medallists for Pakistan
Field hockey players at the 2002 Commonwealth Games
Commonwealth Games medallists in field hockey
Medalists at the 1998 Asian Games
Medalists at the 2010 Asian Games
Field hockey players from Punjab, Pakistan
HC Rotterdam players
Pakistani expatriates in the Netherlands
Expatriate field hockey players
Men's Hoofdklasse Hockey players
Medallists at the 2002 Commonwealth Games